Abablemma is a genus of moths in the family Erebidae. The genus was described by Nye in 1910.

Taxonomy
The genus was previously classified in the subfamily Acontiinae of the family Noctuidae.

Species
In alphabetical order:
Abablemma bilineata (Barnes & McDunnough, 1916) Texas
Abablemma brimleyana (Dyar, 1914) North Carolina
Abablemma discipuncta (Hampson, 1910) Panama
Abablemma duomaculata (Barnes & Benjamin, 1925)
Abablemma grandimacula (Schaus, 1911) Costa Rica
Abablemma ulopus (Dyar, 1914) Panama

References

 Adams, J. K. Moths and Butterflies of Georgia and the Southeastern United States
 Hodges, R. W. (ed.) (1983) Check List of the Lepidoptera of America North of Mexico

Scolecocampinae
Noctuoidea genera